Nathalie Fauquette (born 23 March 1987) is a former French rhythmic gymnast, now a dancer. She started rhythmic gymnastic at the age of 7 and later trained under Katia Guillère.

After training for the 2008 Summer Olympics, she started a new career. In 2008, she appeared in the French musical Cléopâtre, la dernière reine d'Égypte (as a gymnast and dancer) and in 2010 she was cast as Mina in Dracula, l'amour plus fort que la mort (the part includes dancing and acting).

External links
 

1987 births
Living people
French rhythmic gymnasts